The Capital Hoedown was an annual outdoor music festival that took place in August in Ottawa, Ontario, Canada. Started in 2010, the three day festival was one of the largest in North America.

2010

Artists
Artists include: Emerson Drive, Lorrie Morgan, Alan Jackson, Tara Oram, Jo Dee Messina, Dwight Yoakam, and Vince Gill.

Venue and dates
The first Capital Hoedown was held August 5–7, 2010 at Rideau Carleton Raceway.

2011

Artists
Artists include: Tara Oram, Doc Walker, Kenny Chesney, Jason Blaine, Billy Currington, Miranda Lambert, Carrie Underwood, The Keats, Justin Moore, Easton Corbin, Sara Evans, and Rascal Flatts.

Venue and dates
The second Capital Hoedown was held August 11–13, 2011 at LeBreton Flats.

2012 
On July 9, the 2012 edition of the Capital Hoedown was cancelled. This was supposedly due to higher than expected costs from the city, several unforeseen operating obstacles, alleged media reports containing defamatory and injurious statements towards the festival and the city's denial for a new event permit.

On February 26, 2014, Capital Hoedown founder, Denis Benoit, filed a $250,000 defamation lawsuit against Ottawa musician Greg Harris, better known as Lefty McRighty, for a blog post written regarding Benoit's administration of the cancelled festival. Benoit's suit alleges the post "severely injured" his "credit, character and reputation as a reputable businessperson."

On March 7, 2014, Capital Hoedown founder, Denis Benoit, filed a $250,000 defamation lawsuit against Cornwall promoter Jeff Brunet for slandering him in an interview Brunet gave to the Cornwall Standard-Freeholder in June 2012.

Artists
Artists scheduled to appear: Taylor Swift, Brad Paisley, Reba McEntire, Sheryl Crow, The Band Perry, Ronnie Dunn, Terri Clark, Gord Bamford, Tara Oram, Dean Brody, Marshall Dane, Chad Brownlee and High Valley.

Controversy
In May 2010, Capital Hoedown organizers were contacted by owners of The O-Town Hoedown, another Ottawa country music festival established in 2007.  O-Town Hoedown took issue with the similarity of the name "Capital Hoedown" to that of their own festival, and requested a name change. Capital Hoedown refused the request.

See also
 
List of country music festivals
List of festivals in Canada
Music of Canada

References

External links
 Capital Hoedown Country Music Festival Official Website
 Sound Check Entertainment HoeDown Coverage The new home for the former Ottawa Citizen Blog: HoeDown Blogger

Folk festivals in Canada
Music festivals established in 2010
Music festivals in Ottawa
Country music festivals in Canada